Lake Eva, located west of Polk County Road 557, is on the north side of the city of Lake Alfred, Florida. Its east shore is bordered by some homes with large lots. The northeast, north and west shores are bordered by citrus groves. A swampy area is on the south shore and a grassy area is along the southeast shore.

Lake Eva is completely surrounded by private property. There is no public access to Lake Eva other than a canal on the lake's southwest that connects to nearby Lake Alfred. However, this canal is too shallow to be navigated by any boats and it is sometimes dry. There is no information about the types of fish in the lake, although it appears in an area map in the Take Me Fishing website.

References

Eva